Philip Maxwell (April 3, 1799 - November 5, 1859) was an American physician and politician.

Life
Philip Maxwell was born in Guilford, Vermont on April 3, 1799. Maxwell moved to Sackett's Harbor, New York, where he became a physician. He was a member of the New York State Assembly (Jefferson Co.) in 1832. He became  a physician for the United States Army and was assigned to Fort Dearborn, Chicago, Illinois as an Assistant Surgeon, until it was abandoned in 1836. He was promoted to full surgeon in 1838 and served with General Zachary Taylor. He decided to make his home in Chicago after resigning from the service. From 1844 to 1847, he ran a doctors office at the corner of Lake and Clark Streets. The next year, he formed a partnership with Brock McVickar. Known for his jolly demeanor, the corpulent physician died on November 5, 1859. Chicago's famous Maxwell Street is named for him.

1799 births
1859 deaths
People from Jefferson County, New York
Politicians from Chicago
People from Guilford, Vermont
Members of the New York State Assembly
19th-century American politicians